Roksan is a British manufacturer of high fidelity audio products for domestic use, based in Rayleigh, Essex. It is best known for its influential and innovative design for hi-fi equipment, and in particular its Xerxes platform for playing LP records.

The company 
Roksan was formed in 1985 by Tufan Hashemi & Touraj Moghaddam, graduates of the University of London, Imperial College London & Queen Mary College. The company's first product was launched at a
hi-fi show in London in 1985.

The name Roksan itself is derived from the name of Roxana, daughter of the Persian King Darius. This closely reflects the Persian heritage and roots of both Hashemi and Moghaddam. Not surprisingly many of Roksan's product names have references to names of cities, places and famous people of Persia (now Iran).

Moghaddam, having then just obtained his PhD at Imperial College, became dissatisfied with the state of the audio arts when he heard his little TV set more musically satisfying than his already high-end Linn/Naim tri-amped audio system, and began experimentation. He deduced that where the existing turntable design failed was that the cartridge must be held still wherever the groove goes, and thus the mean line traced by the groove relative to the body of the cartridge needed to be constant. His ideas led him away from using the sprung sub-chassis as part of the speed-controlling system. Moghaddam built a prototype using a fire door. Hashemi, a friend who had heard the new prototype turntable and wanted one, teamed up to start the company. The Darius loudspeaker design, based on the re-examination of the relationship between and magnitudes of movements of the tweeter and the woofer, was already in prototype. The concept stunned the trade when it was demonstrated at the 1985 hi-fi show where the Xerxes was launched.

In 1990, Roksan employed John Cornock, an Industrial Design graduate from Manchester Polytechnic, to assist in the development of new product lines. He contributed to the aesthetics of the first Radius record player, DP1 CD transport, ROK amplification, Attessa range and the flagship Touraj Moghaddam Signature (TMS) turntable, named after the company's chief designer and founder. In 2002, the TMS2 replaced the TMS turntable. John later rejoined the company to create the aesthetic design for the K3 range of electronics, the all-new Blak range and limited run Oxygene record player.

In 1996, the company was acquired by Verity plc, a hi-fi group that owned the Mission, Wharfedale and Quad brands. But when Verity demerged around two years later to concentrate on flat-panel speaker technology, Hashemi and Moghaddam reacquired their company.

According to public records, Touraj Moghaddam resigned his directorships of Roksan on 15 July 2011. He remains at Vertere Acoustics, where he focuses his efforts on cables.

In November 2016, British HiFi manufacturers Monitor Audio acquired Roksan.

Products

Turntables
The Xerxes, named after the Persian king who "went around having a good time", has been acclaimed by a number of hi-fi reviewers.  This belt-drive turntable without a sprung sub-chassis challenged conventional suspension designs for build and sound quality. It succeeded in finding favour with British "flat-earthers".

The design attacked the "high-ground" by eschewing the spring isolation, which was then regarded as a major strength. Instead, it addressed the issues of Groove drag and lateral rigidity, the ultimate objective of which was to stabilise the relationship between cartridge stylus and the spinning record groove. Springs were not considered sufficiently rigid in the lateral plane, and permitted too much rotation of the suspended parts relative to the motor.

While most other designs relied on inertia (through platter mass) to attenuate the problem, Roksan retained a light platter, but addressed drag by mounting the motor on its own bearing and restricted its long-range movement by a small spring, so that the revolving armature could still drive the system. Xerxes was named #53 "Hot Product by Stereophile in 2002.

Radius 5 & the Radius 7 are the entry-level turntables, the latter having a high precision and stability speed control built in, designed by Simon Taylor who joined the company in 2013.

Loudspeakers
Roksan was the first company ever to mechanically isolate the speaker tweeter from the bass unit using springs, in their Darius loudspeaker. This design concept has since been followed by other high end speaker manufacturers.

Electronics
Roksan now has over 30 different products which include analogue and digital sources, electronics amplification and loudspeakers for audio as well as home cinema.

In 2009, following a philosophy of building high quality components at an affordable price, Roksan launched the K2 stereo integrated amplifier. At a time when British manufacturers had done away with the phono stage for budget products, the K2 was notable in actually having a 47k ohm input for moving-magnet cartridges. The K3 replaced the K2 in 2012, having an uprated power supply and Bluetooth aptX as standard.

2015 saw the introduction of the blak, a new amplifier with a new 'dual monoblock' design, with XLR inputs, bluetooth and a high performance phono input.

On 7th of July 2021, the company released their Attessa range, with a turntable, Amplifier, Streamer Amplifier and CD transport.

Milestones

1985, introduction of the  Xerxes turntable.
1986, launched the  Darius loudspeaker
1987, introduced the  Artemiz tonearm
1987, their first moving coil phono cartridge, the  Shiraz, was launched.
1988, Roksan's first lifestyle product, the Hot Cake loudspeakers introduced.
1989, introduced their first phono amplifier, Artaxerxes, fitted inside the Xerxes, into which plugged directly the tonearm cable.
1989, launched the budget Radius record player, Tabriz arm and Corus moving magnet cartridge.
1990, first range of electronics, the ROK S1 stereo amplifier and M1 mono amplifier with matching pre amplifiers and power supplies.
1991, Roksan's first CD player, the ROK DP1 introduced
1991, launched top of the range  TMS record player.
1992, Roksan replaced the ROK DP1 with the Attessa CD playing system consisting of CD transport, DAC and power supply.
1993, production of the new Ojan 3 and 3X loudspeakers started.
1994, Rokone loudspeaker was released in a variety of real wood veneers.
1994, Attessa and the ROK series of products were fully upgraded to DP3 and ROK 1.5 versions.
1995, the 3 plinth 10th anniversary Xerxes.X, implementing design ideas from the TMS, replaced the original Xerxes turntable.
1998, the four piece Caspian Audio System (Integrated amplifier, CD player, and FM Tuner) was launched.
1999, a digital surround sound processor (DSP), a five-channel AV amplifier and DVD player were added to the Caspian system.
2000, Introduction of the new Kandy line, lifestyle starter Audio System.
2001, the Caspian phono amplifiers were released.
2002, TMS2 replaced the original TMS.
2003, release of the Radius 5 turntable and Nima tonearm, and the Roksan set-up LP for record players.
2003, Kandy MKIII system, (Kandy integrated amplifier, stereo amplifier, Three channel amplifier, CD player and AM/FM Tuner) released.
2004, Caspian M-series (Pre amplifier, mono amplifier, integrated amplifier, stereo power amplifier, phono amplifier, CD player, FM tuner and dedicated Xerxes speed control).
2004, released ALTITUDE, its first ever recording of a collection of some very special music from some very talented musicians.
2005, 20th anniversary Xerxes.20 replaced the Xerxes.X, incorporated the new improved TMS2 bearing ball and the new Rmat-5 sub-plinth for record players; reference R-series7 mono block, preamplifier
2005, Kandy LIII integrated amplifier, power amplifier and CD player
2007, Platinum preamplifier and power amplifier
2007, Kandy K2 integrated amplifier, power amplifier and CD player
2008, TMS3 record player
2008, Xerxes 20+ record player
2009, Kandy K2 TR5 standmount ribbon speakers
2009, Radius 5 Mk-II/Nima record player
2010, Caspian M2 integrated amplifier and CD player
2011, Caspian M2 power amplifier
2012, Oxygene digital integrated amplifier and CD player AptX bluetooth connectivity
2013, Kandy K2 BT integrated amplifier with AptX bluetooth connectivity
2014, Kandy K3 integrated amplifier with AptX bluetooth connectivity, DAC and CD player
2014, Kandy TR5-S2 standmount ribbon speakers
2015, Capian VSC series record player speed controls and reference phono stage
2016, blak integrated amplifier with AptX bluetooth connectivity, and included DAC
2016, blak CD player
2016, Radius 7 record player with integrated speed control. Also in glass effect and pink finishes
2018, Corus 2 midrange audiophile, moving magnet, vinyl turntable cartridge
2019, SARA unipivot tonearm for use with high-quality turntables
  2021, Attessa range including turntable, Amplifiers and CD Transport

See also
 List of phonograph manufacturers

References

External links
Official Roksan website

Audio amplifier manufacturers
Compact Disc player manufacturers
Companies established in 1985
Audio equipment manufacturers of the United Kingdom
Loudspeaker manufacturers
Phonograph manufacturers
British brands
1985 establishments in England